Harpy is a comic book supervillain in DC Comics.

Publication history
Iris Phelios is the girlfriend of Maxie Zeus. Iris donned a winged costume to battle Batman in defense of Zeus. Iris Phelios first appeared in Batman #481 (July, 1992) and was created by Doug Moench and Jim Aparo.

Fictional character biography
Iris Phelios is the girlfriend of Batman villain Maxie Zeus. After aiding in the robbery of an ancient funerary urn she suspects Zeus' men of a double cross and dons a bird themed costume to punish them as the Harpy only to be interrupted by Batman.

References

Comics characters introduced in 1992
DC Comics female supervillains
Cultural depictions of Harpies